Gerry Matthews (born October 27, 1941) is an American basketball coach.  He retired in August 2016 as the head men's basketball coach at Stockton University in Galloway Township, New Jersey, a position he had held since 1985.  Matthews previously coached basketball at the high school level.  He is an alumnus of Kean University.

A resident of Brielle, New Jersey, Matthews accumulated a record of 228–98 as a basketball coach at Long Branch High School and Rumson-Fair Haven Regional High School.

See also
 List of college men's basketball coaches with 600 wins

References

External links
 Stockton profile

1941 births
Living people
American men's basketball coaches
Basketball coaches from New Jersey
College men's basketball head coaches in the United States
High school basketball coaches in the United States
Kean University alumni
People from Brielle, New Jersey
Sportspeople from Monmouth County, New Jersey
Stockton Ospreys men's basketball coaches